The Kartal class is a class of fast attack missile and torpedo boats of the Turkish Navy.

However, unlike the Zobel class, which were armed with only torpedoes, the Kartal class are armed with missiles and torpedoes, and can carry up to four mines.

TCG Kartal was the first vessel of the class to be launched, but TCG Denizkuşu was the first to be delivered and commissioned. TCG Meltem sank after colliding with the Soviet training ship Khasan in 1985. Meltem was salvaged, but never repaired.

List of boats

See also
 List of Turkish Navy ships

References

Citations

References

External links
 Official Turkish Navy site
 Turkish Navy Kartal class patrol craft

Missile boats of the Turkish Navy
Missile boat classes